The 1910 Wisconsin Badgers football team represented the University of Wisconsin as a member of the Western Conference during the 1910 college football season. Led by Thomas A. Barry in his third and final season as head coach, the Badgers compiled an overall record of 1–2–2 with a mark of 1–2–1 in conference play, tying for fifth place in the Western Conference. The team's captain was James P. Dean.

Schedule

References

Wisconsin
Wisconsin Badgers football seasons
Wisconsin Badgers football